Libby Hague  (born 1950) is a Canadian artist based in Toronto, Ontario. She is known for her large scale print installations. Her work has been exhibited in prominent galleries across Canada, including the Art Gallery of Ontario.

Background
Born in St. Thomas, Ontario, Hague received her B.F.A. from Sir George Williams University (now Concordia University) in 1971. She is known for her large scale installations composed primarily of paper and prints. She is a member of the cooperative Loop Gallery, and is also affiliated with Open Studio, where she served as vice president from 1988–1990. From 1988-2002 she taught print-making at Sheridan College. She is represented in many public collections and galleries across Canada, including the Donovan Collection at the University of Toronto. Hague's work deals with themes of disaster, precariousness, and hope. Her complex works often have playful qualities, and she has described her process as experimental and fluid.

References

External links
Interview with the Artist
CCCA Database Entry

1950 births
Living people
Artists from Ontario
Canadian contemporary artists
Canadian installation artists
People from St. Thomas, Ontario
Sir George Williams University alumni
Academic staff of Sheridan College
Canadian collage artists
Women collage artists
20th-century Canadian printmakers
Women printmakers
21st-century Canadian women artists
20th-century Canadian women artists
Members of the Royal Canadian Academy of Arts